Stateless is a Canadian documentary film, directed by Michèle Stephenson and released in 2020. The film centres on the crisis of Haitians in the Dominican Republic, many of whom have been left stateless by the Dominican Republic's 2013 decision to strip citizenship from Haitian immigrants and their descendants.

The film premiered on April 15, 2020 at the Tribeca Film Festival. It was subsequently screened as part of the 2020 Hot Docs Canadian International Documentary Festival, where it won the special jury prize for Canadian documentaries, and at the BlackStar Film Festival, where it won the award for Best Feature Documentary.

It was released for streaming through the National Film Board of Canada's website.

The film received a Canadian Screen Award nomination for Best Feature Length Documentary at the 9th Canadian Screen Awards in 2021, and was a nominee for the DGC Allan King Award for Best Documentary Film at the 2021 Directors Guild of Canada awards.

References

External links
 
 Stateless at Library and Archives Canada

2020 films
2020 documentary films
Canadian documentary films
Black Canadian films
2020s Canadian films